An art bike is any bicycle modified for creative purposes while still being ridable. It is a type of kinetic sculpture. The degree of artistic creativity and originality or new functionality of art bikes varies greatly, depending on the artist or designer's intentions (as well as the subjective interpretation of what "art" is by the observer).

Examples

 The annual Burning Man festival (held in the Black Rock Desert of Nevada, United States) is a popular setting for members of the art bike community to display and ride their sometimes radically modified and decorated bicycles.
 The Dekochari is a form of art bike indigenous to Japan.
 A cycle rickshaw is a bicycle designed to carry passengers; in countries like Bangladesh, India, Japan and South Africa these cycle rickshaws may feature elaborate decorations and can be considered art bikes.
 Clown bikes and tall bikes are forms of art bikes.
 "Pimp My 'Fahrrad'" is a German TV show featuring "pimped" bicycles especially modified for urban environments.

See also 
 Outline of cycling
 Art car

External links

 "Slimm Buick - Bike Art"
 "Bikengruvin - Recycled Bicycle ART"
 Bicycle Forest's Homebuilders' Gallery
 Burning Bikes Tribe
 Couchbike
 "BikeRod&Kustom Webzine"
 "Artbike Movie"
 

Cycle types
Types of sculpture
Decorated vehicles